Acheron Lake is the B-shaped 315 m long in southwest-northeast direction and 186 m wide lake on President Beaches, Byers Peninsula on Livingston Island in the South Shetland Islands, Antarctica. It has a surface area of 4.4 ha, and is separated from Osogovo Bay waters by a 10 to 25 m wide strip of land. Lucifer Crags surmount the lake on the southwest. The area was visited by early 19th century sealers.

The feature is named after Acheron River in Greek underworld.

Location
Detailed Spanish mapping in 1992, and Bulgarian mapping in 2009 and 2017.

Maps
 Península Byers, Isla Livingston. Mapa topográfico a escala 1:25000. Madrid: Servicio Geográfico del Ejército, 1992
 L. Ivanov. Antarctica: Livingston Island and Greenwich, Robert, Snow and Smith Islands. Scale 1:120000 topographic map. Troyan: Manfred Wörner Foundation, 2009. 
 L. Ivanov. Antarctica: Livingston Island and Smith Island. Scale 1:100000 topographic map. Manfred Wörner Foundation, 2017. 
 Antarctic Digital Database (ADD). Scale 1:250000 topographic map of Antarctica. Scientific Committee on Antarctic Research (SCAR). Since 1993, regularly upgraded and updated

See also
 Antarctic lakes
 Livingston Island

Notes

References
 Acheron Lake. SCAR Composite Gazetteer of Antarctica
 Bulgarian Antarctic Gazetteer. Antarctic Place-names Commission. (details in Bulgarian, basic data in English)
 Management Plan for Antarctic Specially Protected Area No. 126 Byers Peninsula. Measure 4 (2016), ATCM XXXIX Final Report. Santiago, 2016

External links
 Acheron Lake. Adjusted Copernix satellite image

Bodies of water of Livingston Island
Lakes of the South Shetland Islands
Bulgaria and the Antarctic